Acalolepta woodlarkiana is a species of beetle in the family Cerambycidae. It was described by Stephan von Breuning in 1935. It is known from Papua New Guinea and the Solomon Islands.

References

Acalolepta
Beetles described in 1935